Irene Ryan (born Irene Noblitt, Noblett, or Noblette; October 17, 1902 – April 26, 1973) was an American actress and comedienne who found success in vaudeville, radio, film, television, and Broadway. She is most widely known for her portrayal of Daisy May "Granny" Moses, mother-in-law of Buddy Ebsen's character Jed Clampett on the long-running TV series The Beverly Hillbillies (1962–1971). She was nominated for Emmy Awards for Outstanding Lead Actress in a Comedy Series in 1963 and 1964 for the role.

Early years
Ryan was born Irene Noblitt, Noblett or Noblette on October 17, 1902, in El Paso, Texas. She was the second child and latter daughter born to Catherine J. "Katie" (née McSharry) and James Merritt Noblitt. Her father was an army sergeant from North Carolina and her mother had emigrated from Ireland. Jessie Irene was 17 years younger than her sister, Anna.

Career
Ryan began her performing career at the age of 11, when she won $3 for singing "Pretty Baby" in an amateur contest at the Valencia Theater in San Francisco.

At 20, she married writer-comedian Tim Ryan. They performed in vaudeville as a double act, known in show business as a "Dumb Dora" routine, and epitomized by George Burns and Gracie Allen. Known professionally as "Tim and Irene" (and billed formally as Tim Ryan and Irene Noblette), they starred in 11 short comedies for Educational Pictures between 1935 and 1937. The films were usually vehicles for their vaudevillian dialogue, with Irene as the flighty young woman who drives Tim to distraction. Tim's frequent admonition, "Will you stop?", became a catchphrase and then the title of one of their shorts. Substituting for Jack Benny in 1936, they starred in The Jell-o Summer Show on NBC's Red Network.

The Ryans had no children and divorced in 1942, although Irene kept the surname. She toured with Bob Hope, and was on his radio program for two years. She played Edgar Kennedy's wife in two of his RKO short films in 1943. That same year, she appeared in the country music film O, My Darling Clementine.

By 1943, Tim Ryan had become a prolific character actor in movies; Monogram Pictures reunited Tim and Irene for four feature films, the last being the 1944 musical feature Hot Rhythm with Dona Drake.

In 1946, Irene married Harold E. Knox, who worked in film production (they divorced in 1961, having had no children). She continued to work in motion pictures into the late 1940s and early 1950s, generally playing fussy or nervous women. In 1946, she joined the cast of The Jack Carson Show on CBS Radio, playing "a neighborhood storekeeper who operates a combination candy shop and lending library." In January 1955, she made her first television sitcom appearance in an episode of the CBS series The Danny Thomas Show. She appeared with Walter Brennan in the 1959 episode "Grandpa's New Job" on the ABC sitcom The Real McCoys. In the 1960-1961 CBS sitcom Bringing Up Buddy, starring Frank Aletter, she was cast in three episodes as Cynthia Boyle, and she appeared as Rusty Wallace in "The Romance of Silver Pines", a 1962 episode of My Three Sons, starring Fred MacMurray. She guest-starred as Ellie McCabe in "The Old Stowe Road," a 1962 episode of the CBS sitcom Ichabod and Me. In 1966, Ryan was a contestant/celebrity guest star on the game show Password.

The Beverly Hillbillies
Ryan was cast in what was her best known role in 1962 as Daisy "Granny" Moses, mother-in-law of patriarch Jed Clampett, in The Beverly Hillbillies (although Ryan was only five and a half years older than Ebsen). The character was named in honor of the artist Anna Mary Robertson "Grandma" Moses, who had died aged 101 the previous year, and only started her professional career as a painter in her later years.

According to Filmways publicist Ted Switzer, series creator and producer Paul Henning had decided to cast Bea Benaderet as Granny, but when Ryan read for the role "with her hair tied back in a bun and feisty as all get-out," everyone was taken with her performance. Executive producer Al Simon and Henning immediately said, "That's Granny!" Later, when Benaderet saw Ryan's audition, she agreed. Benaderet was cast as Jed Clampett's cousin, Pearl Bodine.

In 1966, Irene Ryan played Granny in the comedy Don't Worry, We'll Think of a Title, co-starring Rose Marie and Morey Amsterdam.

Stage
In 1972, Ryan starred as Berthe in the Bob Fosse-directed Broadway musical Pippin, in which she sang the number "No Time at All." A live recording (sound with still photographs) was made.

Club
In 1965, Ryan signed a two-year contract to perform at the Sahara Hotel in Las Vegas, Nevada.

Recognition
In both 1963 and 1964, Ryan was nominated for an Emmy Award for Outstanding Continued Performance by an Actress in a Series (Lead).

Ryan was nominated for Broadway's 1973 Tony Award as Best Supporting or Featured Actress (Musical) for her performance in Pippin. She lost to Patricia Elliott (A Little Night Music) in a ceremony held about a month before Ryan's death.

Death
Ryan was a lifelong heavy smoker, and stated in an interview that she "smoked like a chimney" on set and her castmates had genuine concerns about her health. On March 10, 1973, Ryan suffered an apparent stroke during a performance of Pippin, flew home to California on her doctor's orders, and was hospitalized. She was diagnosed with an inoperable glioblastoma (malignant brain tumor). Ryan died at St. John's Hospital, Santa Monica, California, on April 26, 1973, aged 70. The causes of death were given as glioblastoma and arteriosclerotic heart disease. Her body was interred in a mausoleum at the Woodlawn Memorial Cemetery in Santa Monica beside her sister, Anna Thompson.

Legacy and charitable causes
The Irene Ryan Acting Scholarship awards scholarships to outstanding actors who participate in the Kennedy Center American College Theater Festival. The scholarship provides "recognition, honor, and financial assistance to outstanding student performers wishing to pursue further education." These scholarships have been awarded by the Irene Ryan Foundation since 1972.

Selected filmography

 Melody for Three (1941) - Mrs. Veronica Higby (uncredited)
 Reveille with Beverly (1943) - Elsie (uncredited)
 Melody Parade (1943) - Gloria Brewster
 The Sultan's Daughter (1943) - Irene
 O, My Darling Clementine (1943) - Irene
 Hot Rhythm (1944) - Polly Kane
 San Diego, I Love You (1944) - Sheila Jones
 That's the Spirit (1945) - Bilson
 The Beautiful Cheat (1945) - Miss Beatrice Kent
 That Night with You (1945) - Prudence
 Diary of a Chambermaid (1946) - Louise
 Little Iodine (1946) - Mrs. Tremble
 The Woman on the Beach (1947) - Mrs. Wernecke
 Heading for Heaven (1947) - Molly the Maid
 Arch of Triumph (1948) - Irate Wife (uncredited)
 Texas, Brooklyn & Heaven (1948) - Opal Cheever
 My Dear Secretary (1948) - Mary
 Mighty Joe Young (1949) - Southern Belle at the Bar (uncredited)
 The Skipper Surprised His Wife (1950) - Mrs. O'Rourke (uncredited)
 Half Angel (1951) - Nurse Kay
 Meet Me After the Show (1951) - Tillie, Delilah's Maid
 Bonzo Goes to College (1952) - Nancy
 The WAC from Walla Walla (1952) - WAC Sgt. Kearns
 Blackbeard the Pirate (1952) - Alvina - Lady in Waiting
 Ricochet Romance (1954) - Miss Clay
 Spring Reunion (1957) - Miss Stapleton
 Rockabilly Baby (1957) - Eunice Johnson
 Desire in the Dust (1960) - Nora Finney
 Don't Worry, We'll Think of a Title (1966) - Granny (uncredited)

Notes

References

External links
 
 
 Irene Ryan profile, who2.com
 National Irene Ryan Award Winners, kennedy-center.org
 
 

1902 births
1973 deaths
20th-century American actresses
Actresses from San Francisco
Actresses from El Paso, Texas
American film actresses
American radio actresses
American stage actresses
American television actresses
Deaths from arteriosclerosis
Deaths from glioblastoma
Deaths from brain cancer in the United States
Vaudeville performers
Burials at Woodlawn Memorial Cemetery, Santa Monica
American people of Irish descent